Steffi Kühnert (born 19 February 1963) is a German actress. She appeared in more than eighty films since 1978. Since November 2009, she has been a professor of acting at the Ernst Busch Academy of Dramatic Art, where she was previously a guest lecturer. Kühnert has also been working as a theatre director at the Mecklenburg State Theatre in Schwerin and the Hans Otto Theatre in Potsdam since 2017.

Selected filmography

References

External links 

1963 births
Living people
German film actresses